London is an unincorporated community located in the counties  of Dane and Jefferson in the U.S. state of Wisconsin. The Dane County portion of London is in the town of Deerfield, while the Jefferson County portion is in the town of Lake Mills.

History
A post office called London was established in 1882, and remained in operation until 1960. A large share of the early settlers being natives of London, England caused the name to be selected.

Recreation
The Glacial Drumlin State Trail passes through London.

Notable people
Herman J. Severson, Wisconsin State Senator and jurist, was principal of a school in London.

Images

References

Unincorporated communities in Dane County, Wisconsin
Unincorporated communities in Jefferson County, Wisconsin
Unincorporated communities in Wisconsin